Jérémy Cordoval (born 12 January 1990) is a professional footballer who plays as a right-back for Championnat National 2 club Hyères. Born in metropolitan France, he plays for the Guadeloupe national team.

Club career
In June 2016, it was announced Cordoval would be rejoining Troyes for a second stint, signing a three-year contract.

On 4 August 2021, he moved to Hyères in the fourth-tier Championnat National 2.

International career
He made his debut for the Guadeloupe national football team on 23 March 2019 in a CONCACAF Nations League qualifier against Martinique, as a starter.

References

External links
 
 

1990 births
Living people
Sportspeople from Villeneuve-Saint-Georges
Association football defenders
Guadeloupe international footballers
Guadeloupean footballers
French footballers
French people of Guadeloupean descent
Ligue 2 players
Championnat National players
Championnat National 2 players
ES Troyes AC players
AS Beauvais Oise players
AS Cannes players
Nîmes Olympique players
LB Châteauroux players
Hyères FC players
Footballers from Val-de-Marne